Trans-Air Service Flight 671 was a cargo flight from Luxembourg Airport to Mallam Aminu Kano International Airport in Kano, Nigeria. While flying over France on March 31, 1992, the Boeing 707 operating the flight experienced an in-flight separation of two engines on its right wing. Despite the damage to the aircraft, the pilots were able to perform an emergency landing at Istres-Le Tubé Air Base in Istres, France. All five occupants of the aircraft survived; however, the aircraft was damaged beyond repair due to a fire on the right wing.

Aircraft and crew

Aircraft
The aircraft was a 28-year-old Boeing 707-321C, serial number 18718. It had been manufactured in April 1964 and was first delivered to Pan Am at end of the month. It had accumulated 60,985 flight hours over 17,907 flights. It was powered by four Pratt & Whitney JT3D-3B engines. During its history, the aircraft's owner and registration had changed multiple times; at the time of the accident, it was registered 5N-MAS and operated for Nigerian operator Trans-Air Service.

Crew
The captain was 57-year-old Swedish national Ingemar Berglund; he had a total of approximately 26,000 hours of flying experience, including 7,100 on the Boeing 707. The first officer was 44-year-old British national Martin Emery; he had approximately 14,000 hours of flying experience, including 4,500 on the Boeing 707. The flight engineer was 55-year-old British national Terry Boone; he had approximately 18,000 hours of flying experience, all on the Boeing 707. A mechanic and a cargo supervisor were also on board the flight. The mechanic was 36-year-old Nigerian national Ike Nwabudike, and the cargo supervisor was 27-year-old Icelandic national Ingebar Einarssen.

Accident
The flight departed Luxembourg Airport at 07:14 UTC on March 31, 1992; it was carrying 38 tonnes of freight and was destined for Mallam Aminu Kano International Airport near Kano, Nigeria. At approximately 08:11, while the aircraft was climbing through  over the Drôme department in southeastern France, the crew noticed severe turbulence and heard a loud "double bang"; the aircraft subsequently began to roll to the right. Captain Berglund then disengaged the autopilot and used control column and rudder inputs to regain control of the aircraft. In addition, the fire warning was continuously audible and could not be switched off by the flight engineer. First Officer Emery subsequently observed that the number 4 engine (the right-most of the aircraft's four engines) had detached from the wing and sent out a mayday call. Emery subsequently noticed that the number 3 engine (the inner engine on the right wing) had also detached from the wing. Captain Berglund subsequently started descending towards Marseille while Flight Engineer Boone began dumping fuel in preparation for an emergency landing.

During the descent, the crew noticed an airfield ahead; this was Istres-Le Tubé Air Base in Istres, France. The crew subsequently decided to land on runway 15 at Istres; this required a left hand circuit prior to landing. This left turn proved to be very challenging for Captain Berglund given the damage to the aircraft's flight controls; the cockpit voice recorder showed that First Officer Emery was encouraging Berglund by repeating the words "left turn" six times. Shortly before landing, the air traffic controller observed a fire on the aircraft.

The aircraft made an emergency landing at Istres at 08:35, approximately 24 minutes after the initial engine separation. During the landing roll, the aircraft ran off the left side of the runway. After the aircraft came to a stop, the crew noticed that there was a fire on the aircraft's right wing. All five occupants of the aircraft survived without any injuries; however, there was considerable fire damage to the right wing. The aircraft was damaged beyond repair.

Investigation
Investigators found that metal fatigue had caused a crack to develop in the pylon that held the number 3 engine (the right inboard engine) to the wing. This weakened the pylon such that it broke on the accident flight, leading to separation of the number 3 engine. The separated number 3 engine then struck the number 4 engine, causing it to separate as well. In addition, an airworthiness directive that required periodic inspections of the pylons was found to be ineffective in detecting such fatigue cracks.

Aftermath
In response to the accident, the French BEA (Bureau of Enquiry and Analysis for Civil Aviation Safety) recommended that inspection procedures for engine pylons be modified so that fatigue cracks can be detected more easily. The BEA also recommended that air traffic controllers receive regular training for emergency situations by theoretical study and by performing practical exercises.

The year after the incident, the crew received the Hugh Gordon-Burge Memorial Award from the Honourable Company of Air Pilots.

In popular culture 
Trans-Air Service Flight 671 was featured on season 22 of the Canadian documentary series Mayday, in the episode titled "Double Trouble".

See also

Other incidents involving engine or propeller separation:
American Airlines Flight 191 - engine separation on takeoff and subsequent crash
El Al Flight 1862, China Airlines Flight 358 - two other instances of in-flight engine separations resulting in fatal crashes
Reeve Aleutian Airways Flight 8 - in-flight propeller separation which damaged flight controls, but the aircraft was able to safely make an emergency landing
Japan Air Lines Cargo Flight 46E - in-flight engine separation, but the crew was able to make an emergency landing
1991 Gulf War KC-135 incident - another Boeing 707 variant that had an in-flight engine separation, but managed to make an emergency landing. The in-engine separation was attributed to wake turbulence from a passing KC-135.

References

External links
 Final report concerning the accident occurred on 31 March, 1992, to the BOEING 707 registered 5N-MAS (Nigeria) - Trans-Air Limited Company. - English translation of final report

Aviation accidents and incidents in France
Accidents and incidents involving the Boeing 707
Aviation accidents and incidents in 1992
Airliner accidents and incidents caused by in-flight structural failure
Accidents and incidents involving cargo aircraft
Airliner accidents and incidents involving in-flight engine separations